Freddie Dredd, born Ryan Mitchel Chassels, is a Canadian JUNO nominated rapper. In 2022 his songs G2G and Cha Cha were certified gold. He has been uploading music to Sound Cloud since 2014 under the producer name Ryan C and rapper name Freddie Dredd. He gained prominence on TikTok with several viral sounds including Opaul and Cha Cha.

References

21st-century Canadian rappers
Year of birth missing (living people)
Canadian TikTokers
Living people